Sandra Hyslop (born 1990) is a British female kayaker who won five medals at individual senior level at the Wildwater Canoeing World Championships and European Wildwater Championships.

She now resides in New Zealand.

References

External links
 Sandra Hyslop at British canoeing

1990 births
Living people
British female canoeists